This list of cemeteries in California includes currently operating, historical (closed for new interments), and defunct (graves abandoned or removed) cemeteries, columbaria, and mausolea which are historical and/or notable. It does not include pet cemeteries.

Alameda County
 Cathedral of Christ the Light Mausoleum, Oakland
 Cedar Lawn Memorial Park, Fremont
 Centerville Pioneer Cemetery (also known as Centerville Presbyterian Cemetery), Fremont
 Chapel of Memories Columbarium, Oakland
 Chapel of the Chimes, Hayward
 Chapel of the Chimes, Oakland
 Dominican Sisters of Mission San Jose Cemetery, Fremont
 Dublin Pioneer Cemetery, Dublin
 Evergreen Cemetery, Oakland
 Holy Sepulchre Cemetery, Hayward
 Lone Tree Cemetery, Fairview
 Mount Eden Cemetery, Hayward
 Mountain View Cemetery, Oakland
 Pleasanton Memorial Gardens Cemetery, also known as IOOF Cemetery, Pleasanton Pioneer Cemetery, Pleasanton
 Roselawn Cemetery, Livermore, also known as Masonic Cemetery
 San Lorenzo Pioneer Memorial Park, also known as San Lorenzo Pioneer Cemetery, San Lorenzo (managed by the Hayward Area Historical Society)
 Saint Augustines Cemetery, Pleasanton
 Saint Mary Cemetery, Oakland

Alpine County

Amador County
 Jackson Pioneer Jewish Cemetery, Jackson

Calaveras County 
 Mokelumne Hill Pioneer Jewish Cemetery, Mokelumne Hill
 Pioneer Cemetery (San Andreas, California)

Colusa County

Contra Costa County
 Oakmont Memorial Park, Pleasant Hill
 Rolling Hills Memorial Park, Richmond

Del Norte County

El Dorado County
 Placerville Pioneer Jewish Cemetery, Placerville
 Placerville Union Cemetery, Placerville

Fresno County
 Ararat Cemetery, Fresno
 Belmont Memorial Park, Fresno
 Mountain View Cemetery, Fresno

Glenn County

Humboldt County

Imperial County

Inyo County
 Manzanar Cemetery, Manzanar

Kern County
 Bakersfield National Cemetery, Arvin

Kings County

Lake County
 Lower Lake Cemetery, Lower Lake

Lassen County
 Lassen Cemetery, Susanville (also known as Lassen County Cemetery; and as Susanville New Cemetery)
 Susanville Cemetery, Susanville (closed since 1918, although nearly 100 additional burials occurred since then)

Los Angeles County
 All Souls Cemetery (Long Beach, California)
 Angelus-Rosedale Cemetery, Los Angeles
 Calvary Cemetery, East Los Angeles
 Cathedral of Our Lady of the Angels Mausoleum, Downtown Los Angeles
 Chapel of the Pines Crematory, Los Angeles
 Chinese Cemetery of Los Angeles, East Los Angeles
 Eden Memorial Park Cemetery, Mission Hills, Los Angeles
 El Campo Santo Cemetery, City of Industry
 Evergreen Cemetery, Los Angeles
 First Jewish site in Los Angeles
 Forest Lawn Memorial-Parks & Mortuaries
 Forest Lawn Memorial Park Cemetery, Glendale
 Forest Lawn, Hollywood Hills Cemetery, Los Angeles
 Forest Lawn Memorial Park, Long Beach
 Grand View Memorial Park Cemetery, Glendale
 Green Hills Memorial Park, Rancho Palos Verdes
 Hillside Memorial Park Cemetery, Culver City
 Hollywood Forever Cemetery, Hollywood
 Holy Cross Cemetery, Culver City
 Home of Peace Cemetery, East Los Angeles
 Inglewood Park Cemetery, Inglewood
 Joshua Memorial Park, Lancaster
 Long Beach Municipal Cemetery, Signal Hill
 Los Angeles National Cemetery, West Los Angeles
 Mission San Gabriel Arcángel Cemetery, Long Beach
 Mount Sinai Memorial Park Cemetery, Hollywood Hills, Los Angeles
 Mount Zion Cemetery, East Los Angeles
 Oak Park Cemetery, Claremont
 Oakwood Memorial Park Cemetery, Chatsworth
 Odd Fellows Cemetery, Los Angeles
 Portal of the Folded Wings Shrine to Aviation, North Hollywood, Los Angeles
 Rose Hills Memorial Park, Whittier
 San Fernando Mission Cemetery, Mission Hills
 San Fernando Pioneer Memorial Cemetery
 Savannah Memorial Park, a.k.a., El Monte Memorial Park or Savannah Pioneer Cemetery, Rosemead, California
 Sierra Madre Pioneer Cemetery, Sierra Madre
 Sunnyside Cemetery (Long Beach, California)
 Valhalla Memorial Park Cemetery, North Hollywood
 Valley Oaks Memorial Park, Westlake Village
 Verdugo Hills Cemetery, Tujunga, Los Angeles
 Westwood Village Memorial Park Cemetery, Westwood
Woodlawn Memorial Park, Compton
 Woodlawn Memorial Cemetery, Santa Monica

Madera County

Mariposa County
 St. Joseph Catholic Church, Rectory and Cemetery, Mariposa
Yosemite Cemetery, Yosemite Village

Marin County 
 Mount Olivet Catholic Cemetery, San Rafael
Mount Tamalpais Cemetery, San Rafael
Tomales Presbyterian Church and Cemetery, Tomales

Modoc County

Mono County

Monterey County
 Mission San Carlos Borromeo de Carmelo, Carmel-by-the-Sea, California
 San Carlos Cemetery (Monterey, California)

Napa County
 St. Helena Public Cemetery, St. Helena
Tulocay Cemetery, Napa

Nevada County 
 Grass Valley Pioneer Jewish Cemetery (or Shaar Zedek), Grass Valley
 Nevada City Jewish Cemetery, Nevada City
 Pioneer Cemetery (Nevada City, California)

Orange County
 Anaheim Cemetery, Anaheim
 Christ Cathedral Memorial Gardens, Garden Grove
 Fairhaven Memorial Park, Santa Ana
 Mission San Juan Capistrano Cemetery, San Juan Capistrano
 Pacific View Memorial Park, Corona del Mar
 Yorba Cemetery, Yorba Linda

Placer County 
 Colfax District Cemetery, Colfax
Rocklin Cemetery, Rocklin

Plumas County
 Big Flat Cemetery, Seneca
 Taylorsville Cemetery, Taylorsville
 Whispering Pines Cemetery, Beckwourth

Riverside County

Sacramento County
 Chevra Kaddisha Cemetery, Sacramento; listed as a California Historical Landmark, first Jewish cemetery in the state
 Chung Wah Cemetery, Folsom; on the National Register of Historic Places
 East Lawn Memorial Park, East Sacramento
Folsom Prison Burial Grounds Cemetery, Folsom
Home of Peace Cemetery, Sacramento
New Helvetia Cemetery, East Sacramento; first cemetery in the city (operated 1845 to 1912)
 Sacramento Historic City Cemetery, Sacramento; also known as "Old City Cemetery"
 Sunset Lawn Chapel of the Chimes, Sacramento

San Benito County

San Bernardino County

San Diego County

San Francisco County
 Golden Gate Cemetery (San Francisco, California), defunct city-owned cemetery 
 Grace Cathedral Columbarium
 Lone Mountain Cemetery, defunct cemetery complex that included Laurel Hill Cemetery, Calvary Cemetery, Masonic Cemetery, and Odd Fellows Cemetery 
 San Francisco Columbarium & Funeral Home, San Francisco
 San Francisco National Cemetery, San Francisco
San Francisco Marine Hospital, was a former psychiatric hospital (operated from 1875 to 1912) with an adjacent cemetery, some of the graves are still visible as of 2006.
 West Coast Memorial to the Missing of World War II

San Joaquin County
 Stockton State Hospital Cemetery, Stockton
 San Joaquin Catholic Cemetery, Stockton

San Luis Obispo County
 Old Santa Rosa Catholic Church and Cemetery, Cambria

San Mateo County
 Cypress Lawn Memorial Park, Colma
 Golden Gate National Cemetery, San Bruno
Hills of Eternity Memorial Park, Colma
 Holy Cross Cemetery, Colma
Holy Cross Cemetery, Menlo Park
Home of Peace Cemetery, Colma
Japanese Cemetery, Colma
Olivet Memorial Park, Colma
Skylawn Memorial Park, San Mateo
 The Italian Cemetery, Colma
Union Cemetery, Redwood City, on the National Register of Historic Places
Woodlawn Memorial Park Cemetery, Colma

Santa Barbara County
 Santa Barbara Cemetery, Santa Barbara

Santa Clara County
 Alta Mesa Memorial Park, Palo Alto
 Stanford Mausoleum, Stanford University
 Mission City Memorial Park, Santa Clara
 Oak Hill Memorial Park, San Jose
 Santa Clara Mission Cemetery, Santa Clara

Santa Cruz County
 Evergreen Cemetery (Santa Cruz, California)
Oakwood Memorial Park (Santa Cruz, California)
Santa Cruz Memorial Park Cemetery, Santa Cruz, California

Shasta County
 Jewish Cemetery, Shasta

Sierra County

Siskiyou County

Solano County
 Sacramento Valley National Cemetery, near Dixon

Sonoma County

Stanislaus County
 Valley Home Memorial Park, Oakdale

Sutter County
 Sutter Cemetery, Sutter

Tehama County

Trinity County

 Lewiston Pioneer Cemetery in Lewiston Historic District, Lewiston; NRHP-listed

Tulare County

Tuolumne County
 Sonora Hebrew Cemetery, Sonora

Ventura County
 Bardsdale Cemetery, Bardsdale
 Conejo Mountain Funeral Home, Memorial Park and Crematory, Camarillo
 Hueneme Masonic Cemetery, Oxnard
 Mount Sinai Simi Valley, Simi Valley
 Nordhoff Cemetery, Ojai
 Oxnard Japanese Cemetery, Oxnard
 Ronald Reagan Presidential Library, Simi Valley
 Santa Paula Cemetery, Santa Paula
 Simi Valley Public Cemetery, includes El Rancho Simi Pioneer Cemetery, Simi Valley

Yolo County
 Davis Cemetery and Arboretum, Davis

Yuba County
 Marysville Cemetery, Marysville
 Marysville Hebrew Cemetery, Marysville

See also
 List of cemeteries in the United States
Pioneer cemetery

References

External links
 California Cemetery Records at Interment.net website
 El Dorado County Pioneer Cemeteries Commission website
 California Cemeteries list from U. S. Geological Survey
 

California